Biangbiang noodles, alternatively known as youpo chemian in Chinese, are a type of Chinese noodle originating from Shaanxi cuisine. The noodles, touted as one of the "eight curiosities" of Shaanxi, are described as being like a belt, owing to their thickness and length.

Biangbiang noodles are renowned for being written using a unique character. The character is unusually complex, with the standard variant of its traditional form containing 58 strokes.

Noodles
The noodles are thick and belt-like, and are usually hand-made. For most of their existence, they have been an obscure dish local to Xi'an, eaten by workers lacking the time to make thinner noodles. More recently, the noodles have become more widely known across China, in a rise driven to some extent by social media interest in the esoteric character used to write biáng.

The word biáng is onomatopoeic, being said to resemble the sound of the thick noodle dough hitting a work surface.

Chinese character for biáng

There are many variations of the character for biáng, but the most widely accepted version is made up of 58 strokes in its traditional form (42 in simplified Chinese). It is one of the most complex Chinese characters in modern usage, although it is not found in modern dictionaries or even in the Kangxi dictionary.

Computer entry and phonetic substitution
Both the traditional and simplified Chinese characters for biáng were encoded in Unicode, on March 20, 2020, for Unicode 13.0.0. The code point is U+30EDE for the traditional form (𰻞) and U+30EDD for the simplified form (𰻝).

Until that point, there were no standardized ways of entering or representing them on computers.

The character is described by the following ideographic description sequences (IDSs):

 (traditional)
 (simplified)

In Adobe's Source Han Sans (prior to 2.002) and Source Han Serif font these IDS sequences do not display as IDS sequences, but display the actual glyphs for the character.

Unicode
After an email discussion with Lee Collins, John Jenkins submitted an application of "" in 2006. However, its IDS was too long at the time and "radical 心 (heart)" is missing from the character shape.

Ming Fan submitted an application to the Unicode Consortium. At WS 2015, the traditional character had a code of UTC-00791 and the code of its simplified character is UTC-01312.

However, the evidence for this character does not fully match the character shape. For UTC-00791, "radical 刂 (knife)" has disappeared from the dictionary (which is used as evidence). For UTC-01312, "radical 刂 (knife)" has become "radical 戈 (dagger-axe)" in the academic paper used as evidence. Members of the Unicode Consortium supported the character shape. In a possible April fools' joke, Toshiya Suzuki suggested adding a new block ("CJK Complex Ideographic Symbols"), setting "" as a basic shape, unifying the variation and even admitting "" as a variant of the character.

The character's traditional and simplified forms were added to Unicode version 13.0 in March 2020 in the CJK Unified Ideographs Extension G block of the newly allocated Tertiary Ideographic Plane. The corresponding Unicode characters are:
Traditional: U+30EDE 𰻞
Simplified: U+30EDD 𰻝

Mnemonics

There are a number of mnemonics used by Shaanxi residents to aid recall of how the character is written.

One version runs as follows:

Note that the first two lines probably refer to the character  (roof), building it up systematically as a point and a line (river) with two bends.

Origin of the character

The origins of the biangbiang noodles and the character biáng are unclear. In one version of the story, the character biáng was invented by the Qin dynasty Premier Li Si. However, since the character is not found in the Kangxi Dictionary, it may have been created much later than the time of Li Si. Similar characters were found used by Tiandihui.

In the 2007 season of the TVB show The Web, the show's producers tried to find the origin of the character by contacting university professors, but they could not verify the Li Si story or the origin of the character. It was concluded that the character was invented by a noodle shop.

One hypothesis is that there was no such character or meaning for this word in the beginning, and the word actually came from the sound people make from chewing the noodles, "biang biang biang".

A legend about a student fabricating a character for the noodle to get out of a biangbiang noodle bill also is a commonly believed hypothesis about the origin of the character.

According to a China Daily article, the word "biang" is an onomatopoeia that actually refers to the sound made by the chef when he creates the noodles by pulling the dough and slapping it on the table.

Variants

More than twenty variants of the Traditional character for biáng, having between 56 and 70 strokes:

See also

Taito (kanji)

Notes

References

External links

  CCTV Forum Discussion on biáng Character
  CCTV writeup on the ten strange wonders of Shaanxi
 Pictures of Chinese signs with biáng characters  

Chinese noodles
Shaanxi cuisine
Chinese characters